Britvic plc is a British producer of soft drinks based in Hemel Hempstead, England. It is listed on the London Stock Exchange and is a constituent of the FTSE 250 Index. It produces soft drinks under its own name, and several other brands.

History

The company was founded in the mid-nineteenth century in Chelmsford as the British Vitamin Products Company. It started producing fruit juices in 1938 and started marketing them under the Britvic name in 1949. Acquired by Showerings of Shepton Mallet, and subsequently a division of Allied Breweries from 1968, the company changed its name to Britvic in 1971. In 1986, it merged with Canada Dry Rawlings and acquired the R. White's Lemonade brand.  It acquired Tango and the Corona brand from Beechams in 1987 and since that year it has also owned the UK franchise for Pepsi and 7 Up. In 1995, it bought Robinson's from Reckitt & Colman.

In December 2005, the company underwent an initial public offering (IPO) allowing its main shareholders (InterContinental Hotels Group, Whitbread, Pernod Ricard) to realise their investments. In May 2007, the Company bought the soft drinks and distribution businesses of Ireland's Cantrell & Cochrane (C&C) for £169.5m.

On 14 November 2012, the company announced plans to merge with Scotland's soft drink's producer A.G. Barr, whose brands include Irn-Bru, Tizer and D'n'B, which would have created one of Europe's largest soft drinks companies. The merger was put into serious doubt after the Office of Fair Trading referred the merger to the Competition Commission. On 11 July 2013, A.G. Barr Chairman Ronnie Hanna announced that the proposed merger of Britvic and A.G. Barr had been abandoned.

In May 2017, PepsiCo announced that it had decided to sell up to all of its long-held 4.5 per cent stake in Britvic.

Operations

Most of the company's operations are concentrated in the United Kingdom and Ireland and the company exports to over 50 countries. Its corporate headquarters moved from Chelmsford, Essex to Hemel Hempstead, Hertfordshire, in March 2012.

United Kingdom
The drink brands the company owns in the UK include Britvic mixers, R. White's Lemonade, Tango, Robinson's and J2O – as well as being the licensed bottler for PepsiCo products within the UK. In 2008, Britvic launched Gatorade in the UK, after securing the rights to do so from PepsiCo. In May 2010, Britvic launched a UK specific version of the popular drink, Mountain Dew Energy. It tastes similar to its American counterpart, but has a lower caffeine and sugar content.

Ireland

After their failed IPO C&C's sold their soft drink brands to Britvic, resulting in the company now owning a number of brands in the Republic of Ireland and Northern Ireland, including, Ballygowan Water, Britvic, Cidona, MiWadi, and Energise Sport as well as the rights to the Pepsi and 7 Up brands in the territory through its bottling agreements with PepsiCo.

France
Britvic bought Fruité Entreprises in May 2010 for £298 million. It has since renamed the business Britvic France. It is mainly a fruit juice business, unlike the GB&I businesses that focus on soft drinks.

Brazil
In 2015, Britvic acquired ebba (Empresa Brasileira de Bebidas e Alimentos SA), located in São Paulo, and in 2017 Bela Ischia, located in Rio de Janeiro.

Current brands
Current brands are as follows:

Dilutes
 Robinsons
 MiWadi (Ireland)
 Dafruta (Brazil) 
Water
 Aqua Libra
 Arto LifeWTR
 Ballygowan
 Drench
Carbonated soft drinks
 Tango
 Club (Ireland)
 Purdey's
 Britvic 55
 London Essence Company
 R. White's Lemonade
 TK (Taylor Keith) Lemonade (Republic of Ireland)
 C&C Lemonade (Northern Ireland)
 Energise (Ireland)
 Cidona
Other
 Bela Ischia (Brazil)
 Energise Sport (Ireland)
 Amé
 J2O
 J2O Spritz
 Fruité (France)
 Jus de Fruits (France)
 Maguary (Brazil)
 Maguary Fruit Shoot (Brazil) 
 Moulin De Valdonne (France)
 Natural Tea (Brazil)
 Pressade (France)
 Puro Coco (Brazil)
 Robinsons Fruit Shoot
 Robinsons Fruit Shoot Hydro
 Robinsons Fruit Shoot Juiced
 Robinsons Refresh’d
 Robinsons Fruit Creations
 Robinsons Squash’d
 Teisseire (France)
 Teisseire Fruit Shoot (France)
 Teisseire Fruit Shoot Au Jus (France)
Licensed from PepsiCo
 7 UP
 Pepsi
 Lipton Ice Tea
 Sobe V Water
 Mountain Dew Energy
 Gatorade (Great Britain)
 Rockstar Energy

References

External links

Official site

British brands
British Royal Warrant holders
Companies based in Chelmsford
Companies based in Hemel Hempstead
Companies listed on the London Stock Exchange
Drink companies of the United Kingdom
Gatorade
PepsiCo bottlers
Soft drinks manufacturers
Tango (drink)
Whitbread former divisions and subsidiaries